Frank Street Jr. (born 1943) was a chess player who won the U.S. Amateur Championship in 1965. He was a member of the Takoma Park Chess Club, which included Larry Kaufman and Larry Guilden. In the 1960s, Street, National Masters Walter Harris and Ken Clayton, set the stage for the harnessing of Black talent in the Washington, D.C., area.

Street became a Master in 1965. He initially received recognition by winning the U.S. Amateur Championship in 1965, and for many years thereafter, held the highest rating among African American players. He also won the club championship at the premier chess club, the Washington Chess Divan, by defeating Clayton. Street was the second African American chess player to earn the National Master title after Walter Harris. His picture was on the cover of the July 1965 issue of Chess Life magazine.

References

External links
 
 
 The Rising of the Black Star 2007.
 Black Chess Masters 2007.
 Chess Life Magazine.
 National Master Frank Street Jr.
 A Legendary Chess Zen Master.
 The Chess Drum A sketch of the legendary Frank Street.

1943 births
Living people
Date of birth missing (living people)
African-American chess players
Place of birth missing (living people)
People from Washington, D.C.
21st-century African-American people
20th-century African-American people